The Bangladeshi calendar (also called the Bangla Year) is a civil calendar used in Bangladesh, alongside the Gregorian calendar and the Islamic calendar. With roots in the ancient calendars of the region, it is based on Tarikh-e-Ilahi (Divine Era), introduced by the Mughal Emperor Akbar on 10/11 March 1584. Amartya Sen states that only traces of Akbar's influence survive. The calendar is important for Bangladeshi agriculture, as well as festivals and traditional record keeping for revenue and taxation.

Bangladeshi land revenues are still collected by the government in line with this calendar. The calendar's new year day, Pohela Boishakh, is a national holiday.

Origins
The Saka Era was the widely used in Bengal, prior to the arrival of Muslim rule in the region, according to various epigraphical evidence. The Bikrami calendar was in use by the Bengali people of the region. This calendar was named after king Vikramaditya with a zero date of 57 BCE. In rural Bengali communities, the Bengali calendar is credited to "Bikromaditto", like many other parts of India and Nepal. However, unlike these regions where it starts in 57 BCE, the modern Bangladeshi and Bengali calendar starts from 593 CE suggesting that the starting reference year was adjusted at some point.

Akbar's influence
Crop cycle's depended on solar calendars. The Islamic lunar calendar of the Mughal government, before Akbar's era caused problems in tax collection since the lunar year was shorter than the solar year by about eleven days per year. Akbar commissioned his astronomer Fathullah Shirazi to develop a new syncretic calendar to allow land tax and crop tax collection according to the harvest cycles. In 1584, Emperor Akbar commissioned a new calendar as part of tax collection reforms.

Shirazi's new calendar was known as the Tarikh-e-Ilahi (God's Era). It used 1556 as the zero year, the year of Akbar's ascension to the throne. The Tarikh-e-Ilahi calendar were one of the syncretic reforms Akbar introduced, along with a new religion called Din-ilahi, a syncretic faith that integrated Islam and Indian religious ideas. However, Akbar's ideas were almost entirely abandoned after his death, and only traces of the Tarikh-e-Ilahi calendar survive in the modern Bengali calendar, according to Amartya Sen.

Shamsuzzaman Khan believed that Nawab Murshid Quli Khan was responsible for widely implementing the tax collection according to the Bengali calendar throughout Bengal. Khan promoted celebrations of the Punyaha, a ceremonial collection of land taxes. The calendar year became known as the Bangla san in Arabic and Bangla sal in Persian; both terms mean the Bangla Year.

In 1966, a committee headed by Muhammad Shahidullah was appointed in Bangladesh to reform the traditional Bengali calendar. It proposed the first five months 31 days long, rest 30 days each, with the month of Falgun adjusted to 31 days in every leap year. This was officially adopted by Bangladesh in 1987.

Months and seasons
The calendar has 12 months and 6 seasons, which are illustrated in the table below.

Week
The following illustrates the 7-day Bengali week. Bengali weekdays are named after deities of celestial bodies in the Surya Siddhanta, an ancient treatise on Indian astronomy.

Era and zero year
The government and newspapers of Bangladesh widely use the term Bangla shal (B.S.). For example, the last paragraph in the preamble of the Constitution of Bangladesh reads "In our Constituent Assembly, this eighteenth day of Kartick, 1379 B.S., corresponding to the fourth day of November, 1972 A.D., do hereby adopt, enact and give to ourselves this Constitution."

The zero year in the Bangladeshi calendar era is 593 CE.

Festivals
The following lists major festivals on the Bangladeshi calendar.

Pohela Boishakh

The first day of the month of Boishakh ushers the Bengali New Year and is known as Pohela Boishakh. The festival is similar to New Year's Day, Nowruz and Songkran. The cultural organization Chayanat hosts a notable concert in Ramna Park, starting at dawn on 14 April in Dhaka. The Mangal Shobhajatra parades are brought out in many Bangladeshi cities during the festival and is regarded by UNESCO as an intangible cultural heritage.

The Bengali New Year's Day on 14 April is a national holiday in Bangladesh.

Haal Khata

Traders start a new Haal Khata book on Pohela Boishakh to keep financial records and settle debts.

Boishakhi Mela

The Boishakhi Mela are fairs organized on Pohela Boishakh.

Pahela Falgun

Pahela Falgun, meaning the first of Falgun, is the first day of spring in the Bangladeshi calendar.

Boli Khela

In the Chittagong region, the Boli khela wrestling matches are organized during the month of Boishakh.

Cattle racing
Cattle races are a popular activity in Manikganj and Munshiganj districts during Boishakh.

See also
 Bangladesh Standard Time

References

Calendars
Bangladeshi culture
Time in Bangladesh
National symbols of Bangladesh